This is a list of 145 species in Merosargus, a genus of soldier flies in the family Stratiomyidae.

Merosargus species

Merosargus abana Curran, 1932
Merosargus acutus James, 1971
Merosargus aeneus (Lindner, 1949)
Merosargus akrei James & McFadden, 1971
Merosargus albidus McFadden, 1971
Merosargus albifacies James, 1941
Merosargus albopictus James, 1971
Merosargus alticola McFadden, 1971
Merosargus altifrons James, 1971
Merosargus amethystinus (Lindner, 1969)
Merosargus ampulla James, 1971
Merosargus andinus James, 1971
Merosargus angulatus McFadden, 1971
Merosargus angustus James, 1971
Merosargus antennatus Schiner, 1868
Merosargus anticus Curran, 1932
Merosargus apicalis Lindner, 1935
Merosargus arcuatus James, 1971
Merosargus atriannulatus McFadden, 1971
Merosargus aureonitens James, 1971
Merosargus aurivena James, 1971
Merosargus azureus (Enderlein, 1914)
Merosargus banksi James, 1936
Merosargus barbatus James, 1971
Merosargus basalis James, 1971
Merosargus beameri James, 1941
Merosargus bequaerti Curran, 1928
Merosargus bitaeniatus Lindner, 1949
Merosargus bituberculatus Schiner, 1868
Merosargus bivittatus James, 1971
Merosargus brachiatus James, 1971
Merosargus brunneus Lindner, 1933
Merosargus brunnipes McFadden, 1971
Merosargus bulbifrons Williston, 1900
Merosargus c-nigrum (Lindner, 1951)
Merosargus caeruleifrons (Johnson, 1900)
Merosargus calceolatus Bigot, 1879
Merosargus chalconota (Brauer, 1882)
Merosargus cingulatus Schiner, 1868
Merosargus citrinus James, 1971
Merosargus complicatus James, 1971
Merosargus concinnatus Williston, 1900
Merosargus conopsoides James, 1971
Merosargus contortus James, 1971
Merosargus coriaceus Giglio-Tos, 1891
Merosargus coxalis Lindner, 1949
Merosargus cyaneoscutellatus (Enderlein, 1914)
Merosargus cyrtometopius James, 1971
Merosargus degenerata (Lindner, 1949)
Merosargus dissimilis Giglio-Tos, 1891
Merosargus divisus James, 1971
Merosargus dorsalis Lindner, 1969
Merosargus elatus Curran, 1932
Merosargus elongatus James, 1971
Merosargus ethelia Curran, 1932
Merosargus eunomus James, 1967
Merosargus festivus Williston, 1888
Merosargus flaviceps McFadden, 1971
Merosargus flavissimus James, 1971
Merosargus flavitarsis (Lindner, 1969)
Merosargus flaviventris (Lindner, 1935)
Merosargus fraternus Bigot, 1879
Merosargus frontatus Schiner, 1868
Merosargus frosti James, 1941
Merosargus fumipennis James, 1971
Merosargus geminatus James, 1971
Merosargus golbachi James, 1971
Merosargus gorgona (Lindner, 1949)
Merosargus gowdeyi Curran, 1928
Merosargus gracilior James, 1971
Merosargus gracilis Williston, 1888
Merosargus granulosus James, 1971
Merosargus hansoni James, 1971
Merosargus hoffmanni Lindner, 1935
Merosargus hyalopterus Giglio-Tos, 1891
Merosargus insularis Curran, 1934
Merosargus irwini James & McFadden, 1971
Merosargus lacrimosus James, 1971
Merosargus lampronotus James, 1941
Merosargus laniger James, 1971
Merosargus lateromaculatus James, 1971
Merosargus linearis James, 1971
Merosargus longipes McFadden, 1971
Merosargus longiventris (Enderlein, 1914)
Merosargus luridus Loew, 1855
Merosargus lutzi Curran, 1932
Merosargus lyricus James & McFadden, 1971
Merosargus megalopyge James, 1971
Merosargus melanothorax McFadden, 1971
Merosargus mirabilis James, 1971
Merosargus nebulifer James, 1971
Merosargus nigribasis James, 1971
Merosargus notatus Lindner, 1949
Merosargus obscurus (Wiedemann, 1830)
Merosargus obtusipennis (Lindner, 1949)
Merosargus opaliger Lindner, 1931
Merosargus orizabae Giglio-Tos, 1891
Merosargus pallidus McFadden, 1971
Merosargus pallifrons Curran, 1932
Merosargus panamensis McFadden, 1971
Merosargus par Curran, 1932
Merosargus penai James, 1971
Merosargus peruvianus James, 1971
Merosargus picta (Brauer, 1882)
Merosargus pictipes James, 1971
Merosargus pictithorax Curran, 1933
Merosargus productus James, 1971
Merosargus pseudolyricus James, 1971
Merosargus pulcher James, 1971
Merosargus quadratus James, 1971
Merosargus quadrifasciatus Lindner, 1941
Merosargus robustus McFadden, 1971
Merosargus rossi James, 1971
Merosargus rotundatus Curran, 1932
Merosargus schildi James, 1971
Merosargus scrobiculus McFadden, 1971
Merosargus sexmaculatus McFadden, 1971
Merosargus sexnotatus James, 1941
Merosargus smaragdiferus (Bigot, 1879)
Merosargus spatulatus (Williston, 1900)
Merosargus stamineus (Fabricius, 1805)
Merosargus stigmaticus (Lindner, 1949)
Merosargus subinterruptus (Bellardi, 1859)
Merosargus subobscurus Lindner, 1969
Merosargus supernitens James, 1971
Merosargus taeniatus (Wiedemann, 1830)
Merosargus tangens James, 1971
Merosargus telfordi James, 1971
Merosargus tenebricosus Lindner, 1929
Merosargus tenuicornis James, 1971
Merosargus terminalis James, 1971
Merosargus transversus McFadden, 1971
Merosargus triangulatus McFadden, 1971
Merosargus tripartitus James, 1971
Merosargus tristis Loew, 1855
Merosargus tritaeniatus Lindner, 1929
Merosargus varicornis James, 1971
Merosargus varicrus James, 1971
Merosargus ventralis McFadden, 1971
Merosargus venustulus (Lindner, 1936)
Merosargus vertebratus James, 1971
Merosargus viridis McFadden, 1971
Merosargus zeteki James, 1971

References

Merosargus
Diptera of North America
Diptera of South America